In the United States courts, renewed judgment as a matter of law is a party's second chance at a judgment as a matter of law (JMOL) motion.  Renewed JMOL is decided after a jury has returned its verdict, and is a motion to have that verdict altered.  In US federal courts this procedure has replaced judgment notwithstanding the verdict (JNOV) through Rule 50 of the Federal Rules of Civil Procedure.

The same standards as JMOL apply.  The difference is that renewed JMOL can only be raised if JMOL had been raised before the jury began deliberations.  Seventh Amendment due process concerns demand this formality, as decided by the United States Supreme Court in Baltimore & Carolina Line, Inc. v. Redman, 295 U.S. 654 (1935).

Judgment (law)
Civil procedure